John "Mac an Asal" McDonough (died c. 1857)  was an Irish piper.

McDonough was a native of Annaghdown, County Galway but had travelled widely throughout Ireland, spending a great deal of time in Dublin (at one stage apparently entertaining either faculty of students at Trinity College, Dublin, and associated with Canon James Goodman of Trinity). 

According to O'Neill, "old people speak of this remarkable piper's facility in giving to the music an appeal and expression peculiarly his own. An all-around player, capable of meeting all demands, he had a preference for piece or descriptive music." While in the capital, 

  
"McDonough’s name was placarded conspicuously in Dublin as the celebrated Irish piper from Annaghdown, County Galway, especially on the bridges crossing the Liffey. While playing on the streets one evening, to the keen delight of an appreciative audience, some well-to-do gentry who came along were so captivated by his inimitable execution that they took him into a clubhouse or hotel in the vicinity. No doubt he was treated with much liberality, but when he reappeared on the street some time afterwards, it was noticed that he was under the influence of intoxicants. This so angered the waiting audience that they stoned the building, and didn’t leave a whole pane of glass in the windows within reach of their missiles.  

His nickname, Mac an Asal (son of the ass) arose from his father's profession as a dealer in donkeys or asses. McDonagh Sr. had his son play the pipes, sitting on one of them, as he guided them to a fair or market. 

He was married and had at least one child, a Mrs. Kenny, "Queen of the Irish Fiddlers", who was married to piper John Kenny. Piper|John Flannagan(born 1870) married mrs. Kenny's daughter.

. McDonough himself was reduced to dire poverty by Great Famine, forcing him to leave Dublin and die in Gort poorhouse. 

O'Neill remarks

 
"His splendid instrument, made specially for him by Michael Egan, the most famous of all Irish pipemakers, while both were in Liverpool, was treasured by his widow for seven years after his death. Necessity however forced her to sacrifice her sentiments, and though costing originally twenty pounds she disposed of it for a trice to a pipe-repairer named Dugan, of Merchant’s Quay, Dublin." 

He was unrelated to fellow musician and Galwegian, Pat McDonagh.

References
 "Famous Pipers who flourished principally in the second half of the nineteenth century" Chapter 21 in Irish Minstrels and Musicians, by Capt. Francis O'Neill, 1913.

External links
 Billhaneman.ie
 Billhaneman.ie

1850s deaths
19th-century Irish people
Musicians from County Galway
Musicians from County Dublin
Irish uilleann pipers
Year of birth unknown